B O D Y is an international online literary magazine publishing new work on a rolling basis. It publishes short stories, poetry, creative nonfiction, reviews, translations, essays, artworks, photography, performance texts and has been noted for its elegant, intuitive design and for its editorial vision. B O D Y was founded in Prague by Christopher Crawford, Joshua Mensch and Stephan Delbos in 2012. B O D Y was at the very forefront of the digital revolution of literary magazines and fostered the growing familiarity between US poets and their British counterparts at that time through providing an online platform which features the work of both. It is also noted for regularly publishing Central and Eastern European literature in translation. B O D Y is published in English language.

Notable contributors 
 Richard Siken
 Dara Weir
 Geoffrey Nutter
 Jeffrey McDaniel
 Miklos Radnoti
 Jane Hirshfield
 Jill McDonough
 Daniil Kharms
 Anna Akhmatova
 Laura Kasischke
 Bruce Bond
 Lucy Alibar
 Robert Archambeau (poet)
 Eugenio Montale
 Chard DeNiord
 Rolf Dieter Brinkmann
 Ernest Hilbert
 Justin Quinn
 David Morley
 Alison Brackenbury
 Matthew Olzmann
 Ilya Kaminsky

Masthead 
 Christopher Crawford - Founding Editor
 Joshua Mensch - Founding Editor
 Stephan Delbos - Founding Editor
 Michael Stein - Editor
 Jan Zikmund - Editor
 Jessica Mensch - Art Editor
 Ben Williams - Performance Text Editor

See also
 List of literary magazines

References

Further reading

External links
 B O D Y Homepage

2012 establishments in the Czech Republic
Literary magazines published in the Czech Republic
English-language magazines
Czech literature websites
Magazines established in 2012
Magazines published in Prague
Online literary magazines
Poetry literary magazines